GLOBUS is a radar system in Vardø, on the island of Vårberget in Norway. It is operated by the Norwegian Intelligence Service (NIS) and its official uses are primarily space observation and Arctic airspace monitoring for Norway's national interest, though the site's close proximity to known Russian naval bases as well as U.S. involvement in construction and funding have fueled suspicions that it also serves as part of an American missile defense system.

History

Cold War and Globus I
Norway and the United States, both founding members of the newly-formed NATO, began cooperation on the GLOBUS project began during the Cold War era of the 1950s. By 1988, the Globus I radar array was built and operational in the town of Vardø, just  from the border between Norway and the Soviet Union and within visible range of the Kola Peninsula, which is known to contain high-security Russian naval bases. This came within the same year that the U.S.  condemned the deployment of a large Soviet radar array near Krasnoyarsk, claiming that this violated the 1972 Anti-Ballistic Missile Treaty.

Globus II

Originally known as HAVE STARE and designated AN/FPS-129 by the U.S. military, the Globus II radar was built by the Raytheon Company at Vandenberg Air Force Base, California and became operational in 1995. Although the cost of the radar is classified, it is believed to have cost more than US$100 million. In 1999 Raytheon moved the array to Vardø, Norway in fulfillment of a US$23.5 million contract with the U.S. Defense Department and operations resumed under Norwegian control in 2001.

Globus III
In 2016 construction began on a new array dubbed the Globus III to replace Globus I and work in concert with Globus II. The new radar was estimated to cost US$121 million. On 13 February 2018 it was reported that the local population felt misled about the size of the radar. The construction work was shrouded in secrecy, and many locals were critical, but they were reluctant to speak out because the project brought sorely needed employment to the community. Testing was set to begin in autumn of 2018 with an expected operational date of 2022.

Purpose and controversy
The site is administrated by NIS, which maintains that GLOBUS is operated by Norwegian personnel only and data is not sent to the United States. Their website officially states that the radar is used to:
Monitor, track and categorize objects in space
Monitor our national area of interest in the north
Carry out collection of data for national use in research and development

Raytheon, the company that built Globus II, previously described it on their website as a radar "originally designed to collect intelligence data against ballistic missiles". The website has since been removed by request of the US DoD.

In April 1998, a Norwegian journalist, Inge Sellevåg, from the daily newspaper Bergens Tidende discovered that NASA had no knowledge of a new radar being added to the system, despite the Globus II nearing operational condition. This led her to suspect it had other purposes, and Sellevåg discovered that it was also going to be used for national purposes such as intelligence gathering.

In 2000, during a storm, the radome was torn off and uncovered the Globus II radar dish. At that time it was pointing directly towards Russia. A local newspaper editor commented: "I'm not an expert, but I thought space was in the sky." Official comments claimed that the radar was still being tested and that it being pointed towards Russia was a pure coincidence. NIS official Tom Rykkin stated "if you use a small part of the brain, you know this also has an intelligence mission. ... In the intelligence business, there are certain things you don't make public. It is the nature of the business." The Russian Defense Ministry raised complaints that the radar installation violates the Anti-Ballistic Missile Treaty and were supported in this claim by missile defense expert Theodore Postol of the Massachusetts Institute of Technology.

In March 2017, nine Russian bombers took off from Russia's nearby Kola Peninsula and executed a mock air strike against the radar station, flying in attack formation and turning back just before breaching Norwegian airspace. Then in February of the following year, a very similar mock strike was carried out by eleven Russian fighter jets.
Regarding the GLOBUS system, Russian spokesperson Maria Zakharova stated in 2019 "There is every reason to believe that the radar will monitor precisely the territory of the Russian Federation and will become part of the US missile defense system" and added "It seems obvious to me that military preparations near Russian or any other borders cannot be ignored by our or other countries. We presume that we will take response measures to ensure our own security." Shortly after these statements Russia deployed a Bal missile system to the Sredny Peninsula, just 70 km from Vardø.

References

External links
 A GLOBUS II / HAVE STARE SOURCEBOOK, Federation of American Scientists
 AN/FPS-129 HAVE STARE X-Band Dish radar, GlobalSecurity.org
 

Military equipment introduced in the 1980s
Military installations in Troms og Finnmark
Missile defense
United States Space Surveillance Network
Vardø